Haltwhistle A69 Bridge, West is a concrete bridge across the River South Tyne at Haltwhistle in Northumberland, England.

History
The bridge is a concrete arch bridge, which forms part of the Haltwhistle A69 bypass and was completed in 1997. The creation of the bypass allowed the road through Haltwhistle to be detrunked shortly thereafter.

As well as carrying the A69 road, the bridge has an additional third lane (separated by a concrete safety barrier) to link adjoining minor roads and carry a footpath.

References

Bridges in Northumberland
Crossings of the River Tyne
Haltwhistle